Brion—Montréal-la-Cluse station (French: Gare de Brion—Montréal-la-Cluse) is a French railway station located in commune of Brion, Ain department in the Auvergne-Rhône-Alpes region. The station is also within close proximity of the commune of Montréal-la-Cluse, for which it is jointly named after. It is located at kilometric point (KP) 35.618 on the Ligne du Haut-Bugey (Bourg-en-Bresse–Bellegarde railway).

Opened in 1996 by the SNCF, the station replaced the now closed La Cluse station. Its layout was further modified during the closure of the Haut-Bugey railway between 2005 and 2010.

As of 2022, the station is owned and operated by the SNCF and served by TER Auvergne-Rhône-Alpes trains.

History 
In 2019, the SNCF estimated that 35,922 passengers traveled through the station.

Services

Passenger services 
Classified as a PANG (point d'accès non géré), the station is unstaffed without any passenger services.

Train services 
As of 2022, the station is served by TER Auvergne-Rhône-Alpes trains, which circulate between Bourg-en-Bresse and Oyonnax.

Intermodality 
In addition to car parking, the station is equipped with facilities to enable bicycle storage.

See also 

 List of SNCF stations in Auvergne-Rhône-Alpes

References 

Railway stations in Ain
Railway stations in France opened in 1996